Brian Kroshus (born 1963/1964) is an American businessman and politician serving as the Tax Commissioner of North Dakota. He is a former member of the North Dakota Public Service Commission. Kroshus was appointed to both positions by Governor Doug Burgum.

Early life and education 
Kroshus was born in Fargo, North Dakota and earned a Bachelor of Science degree in animal science from North Dakota State University. As a child, he participated in 4-H programs.

Career 
A member of the Republican Party, Kroshus owns and operates a cattle and grain business. He also worked as the publisher of The Bismarck Tribune for 10 years, and later worked as a publisher of Lee Agri-Media Newspaper Group. He also worked for Forum Communications.

In February 2017, Kroshus was selected to serve as a member of the North Dakota Public Service Commission, succeeding Brian Kalk. Kroshus was a candidate for re-election in 2018. In 2019, he became chair of the Public Service Commission. He was reelected in 2020 with 68% of the vote. He served as chair in 2020.

References 

|-

Businesspeople from North Dakota
Living people
North Dakota Public Service Commissioners
North Dakota Republicans
North Dakota State University alumni
North Dakota Tax Commissioners
People from Fargo, North Dakota
Year of birth missing (living people)